Urbanna is a town in Middlesex County, Virginia, United States. Urbanna means “City of Anne” and was named in honor of England's Queen Anne. The population was 476 at the 2010 census.

Geography
Urbanna is located at  (37.637796, −76.573149).

According to the United States Census Bureau, the town has a total area of 0.5 square miles (1.3 km2), of which, 0.4 square miles (1.1 km2) of it is land and 0.1 square miles (0.2 km2) of it (17.65%) is water.

Demographics

As of the census of 2000, there were 543 people, 266 households, and 160 families residing in the town. The population density was 1,286.5 people per square mile (499.2/km2). There were 354 housing units at an average density of 838.7 per square mile (325.4/km2). The racial makeup of the town was 95.58% White (U.S. Census), 3.50% Black, and 0.92% from two or more races. Hispanic or Latino of any race were 0.55% of the population.

There were 266 households, out of which 20.7% had children under the age of 18 living with them, 46.6% were married couples living together, 11.7% had a female householder with no husband present, and 39.5% were non-families. 35.0% of all households were made up of individuals, and 19.5% had someone living alone who was 65 years of age or older. The average household size was 2.04 and the average family size was 2.61.

In the town, the population was spread out, with 18.6% under the age of 18, 3.7% from 18 to 24, 21.4% from 25 to 44, 30.9% from 45 to 64, and 25.4% who were 65 years of age or older. The median age was 49 years. For every 100 females, there were 70.2 males. For every 100 females age 18 and over, there were 73.3 males.

The median income for a household in the town was $42,054, and the median income for a family was $49,583. Males had a median income of $33,214 versus $28,375 for females. The per capita income for the town was $32,944. About 4.6% of families and 4.7% of the population were below the poverty line, including 6.3% of those under age 18 and 2.3% of those age 65 or over.

Events
For more than 50 years, the town has hosted the Urbanna Oyster Festival. Begun in 1958, the festival is held the first weekend of November each year, from Friday morning to ending Saturday night. Live music, arts and crafts, two parades (the Fireman Parade on Friday night, and the Festival Parade on Saturday afternoon), the renowned oyster-shucking contest, and children's activities are all major attractions. A variety of foods is available from numerous vendors. Annual attendance over the two days is in between 50,000 and 75,000. During the festival, the town is closed to traffic in the afternoon on Friday and for most of the day Saturday. Admission to the event is free of charge, although there is a fee for parking within the vicinity of the festival.

An outdoor art and craft show, Art on the Half Shell, was started in 2001. The juried, one-day event has become quite popular and, like the Oyster Festival, is open to the public at no charge. Local and out of town artists are featured, with a great variety of artistic mediums presented.

August in Urbanna includes Founders' Day, the 2018 event coincides with oyster buyboats on display at the marina.

The Museum in Urbanna, once a Scottish Factor Store, displays a copy of John Mitchell's Map.

Notable residents

 William Overton Callis
 Arthur Lee
 Celia Rowlson-Hall

Climate
The climate in this area is characterized by hot, humid summers and generally mild to cool winters.  According to the Köppen Climate Classification system, Urbanna has a humid subtropical climate, abbreviated "Cfa" on climate maps.

References

External links
 Urbanna Official Website
 Southside Sentinel - Local Newspaper

Towns in Middlesex County, Virginia
Towns in Virginia